Tasmanillus is a genus of ground beetles in the family Carabidae. There are at least two described species in Tasmanillus, found in Australia.

Species
These two species belong to the genus Tasmanillus:
 Tasmanillus daccordii Giachino, 2005
 Tasmanillus pillingeri Giachino, 2005

References

Trechinae